OFK Žarkovo is a football club based in Žarkovo, Belgrade, Serbia. They compete in the Belgrade Zone League, the fourth tier of the national league system.

History

In 2010, the club won first place in the Belgrade Zone League and took promotion to the Serbian League Belgrade. They spent eight seasons in the third tier, before finishing as champions in 2018 and earning promotion to the Serbian First League. In the 2016–17 Serbian Cup, the club defeated Metalac Gornji Milanovac on penalties in the opening round. They were subsequently eliminated by Partizan, losing 2–0. After spending four seasons in the second tier of Serbian football, the club withdrew from the league due to financial problems in June 2022.

Honours
Serbian League Belgrade (Tier 3)
 2017–18
Belgrade Zone League (Tier 4)
 2009–10

Seasons

Notable players
This is a list of players who have played at full international level.
  Stevo Nikolić
  Omega Roberts
  Miloš Bogunović
  Milan Lukač
For a list of all OFK Žarkovo players with a Wikipedia article, see :Category:OFK Žarkovo players.

Managerial history

References

External links
 Club page at Srbijasport

1925 establishments in Serbia
Association football clubs established in 1925
Football clubs in Serbia
Football clubs in Belgrade
Čukarica